Benton School District may refer to:

 Benton School District (Arkansas), based in Benton, Arkansas
 Benton School District (New Hampshire), based in Benton, New Hampshire
 Benton School District (Wisconsin), based in Benton, Wisconsin
 Benton Area School District, based in Benton, Columbia County, Pennsylvania
 Benton Community School Corporation, based in Benton County, Indiana
 Benton Community School District, based in Benton County, Iowa